Miaoshan High-tech Industrial Park is a high tech industrial park in Jiangxia District, Wuhan, Hubei province, China. , it has 7 urban communities and 7 villages under its administration: 
Communities
Meinanshan Community
Tangxunhu Community
Baoli Community
Meijia Community
Yangguang Community
Pu'an Community
Xiangyang Community
Villages
Miaoshan Village
Pu'an Village
Xiangyang Village
Xingfu Village
Wushu Village
Huashanwu Village
Xiaozhafang Village

See also 
 List of township-level divisions of Hubei

References 

Township-level divisions of Hubei
Economy of Wuhan